William Martin Theodore Hawke, 12th Baron Hawke (born 23 June 1995), is a British hereditary peer.

Early life
Hawke was born in 1995 to Edward Hawke, 11th Baron Hawke (1950–2009), and his wife, Bronwen Mae, Lady Hawke (née James). He has a younger sister, Alice, born 1999. He succeeded as Baron Hawke on his father's death in December 2009.

References

 
  

1995 births
Living people
12